Dabravine is a village in the municipality of Vareš, Bosnia and Herzegovina.

During the Second World War, partisan forces attacked fascist forces in the village on the night of the 16th and 17th of January 1942. The partisans were initially successful but withdrew when an armored train arrived.

Demographics 
According to the 2013 census, its population was 326.

References

Populated places in Vareš